David Neil Kidney (born 21 March 1955) is a British Labour Party politician who was the Member of Parliament (MP) for Stafford from 1997 to 2010.

Early life
Kidney attended Pinewood Primary School in Meir (now the new Crescent Primary School), Longton High School then the City of Stoke-on-Trent Sixth Form College. He studied law at the University of Bristol, receiving an LLB. Kidney was a solicitor from 1977–79 in Hanley then in Stafford from 1979–97, and a Stafford Borough councillor from 1987–97. He was a parish councillor of Checkley from 1983–7.

Political career
Having fought the seat unsuccessfully in 1992, Kidney was Member of Parliament for Stafford from 1997, when he defeated Conservative candidate David Cameron, to 2010, when he lost to the Conservative candidate Jeremy Lefroy by 5,460 votes in a 7.4% swing.

He served on the Modernisation Committee from 2001–2005 and was a member of the Treasury Select Committee from 1997–2001. He was a ministerial aide in the Environment team (for which no additional remuneration is given), but resigned in 2003 when he voted against the Iraq War. He became PPS to Elliot Morley Minister of State, Department for Environment, Food and Rural Affairs in November 2005, and in 2006 he became the PPS to the Secretary of State for Environment, Food and Rural Affairs, David Miliband. Following this, Kidney was PPS to Rosie Winterton, then Minister of State for Work and Pensions. He also served as Chair and an officer of several All-Party Groups, including Environment and Conservation & Wildlife. He recently agreed to chair a new All-Party Group formed to highlight the role of science and technology in British agriculture. Kidney also chaired the Associate Parliamentary Group for Looked after Children & Care Leavers and the "Fair Funding F40" group of the 40 lowest funded schools areas in England, campaigning for fairer funding for local schools. In the June 2009 reshuffle Kidney entered the Government as a minister for the first time, becoming Parliamentary Under Secretary of State in the Department for Energy and Climate Change, replacing Joan Ruddock.

Later career

After losing his seat Kidney was employed as head of policy at the Chartered Institute of Environmental Health. He then became Chief Executive of the UK Public Health Register.

Personal life
He has two children, Robert and Katy, and is married to Elaine. Kidney is also a school governor for Silkmore Primary School. He supports the football team Port Vale.

References

External links
 David Kidney official site
 Guardian Unlimited Politics – Ask Aristotle: David Kidney MP
 TheyWorkForYou.com – David Kidney MP
 BBC Politics page

News items
 Caught in a forest fire in Greece in 2006
 Campaigning about prejudice against breastfeeding in 2005
 Questioning closure of RAF Stafford in 2004
 Resigning from the government in 2003

Alumni of the University of Bristol
Labour Party (UK) MPs for English constituencies
People from Longton, Staffordshire
UK MPs 1997–2001
UK MPs 2001–2005
UK MPs 2005–2010
1955 births
Living people
Councillors in Staffordshire
School governors
Members of the Parliament of the United Kingdom for Stafford